Roscorla v Thomas is a notable case in English contract law which demonstrates that past conduct is not sufficient consideration to support a contract.

Facts 

An agreement for the purchase of a horse had been completed between buyer and seller.  Following the completion of the contract, the seller made a warranty that the horse was "free from vice".  Upon delivery, it was discovered by the buyer that the horse was vicious in behaviour.  The buyer consequently sued.

Judgement 

Lord Denman CJ delivered the judgement of the Court.

"It may be taken as a general rule, subject to exceptions not applicable to this case, that the promise must be coextensive with the consideration... a consideration past and executed will support no other promise than such as would be implied by law."

The Court found for the defendant because his promise was unsupported by consideration.  The consideration for the soundness warranty had already been made through the original contract of sale, and so new consideration would have had to be provided in order for the warranty to have legal effect.  This decision demonstrates the rule in English contract law that consideration contracted for in the past does not amount to good consideration for a present agreement.

See also
Consideration in English law

References 

English contract case law